Emitter may refer to:


Devices which emit charged particles
Cathode, or negative electrode, in a vacuum tube or diode
Anode, or positive electrode, in certain applications based on the emission of ions from a solid surface
One of the three terminals of a bipolar transistor

Devices which emit electromagnetic radiation
Lambertian emitter, a light source whose radiance varies with angle according to Lambert's cosine law
An infrared LED used to emulate a remote control

Other uses
A device used in drip irrigation
A compiler's code generator

See also
Emission (disambiguation)
Emiter